Alchorneine is an imidazopyrimidine alkaloid found in trees in the genus Alchornea such as Alchornea castaneifolia, Alchornea floribunda or Alchornea cordifolia.

References 

Alkaloids
Alkaloids found in Euphorbiaceae
Guanidine alkaloids